Henry George Birthplace is a historic home located in the Washington Square West neighborhood of Philadelphia, Pennsylvania. It was built in 1801, and is a three-story brick rowhouse in a late Federal style.  The layout is typical of a Philadelphia rowhouse with a "front building" and "back building."  It also has a "piazza."  Noted journalist and economist Henry George (1839-1897) was born in the house in 1839, and resided there until 1849.

The house was added to the National Register of Historic Places in 1983.

References

External links

Houses completed in 1801
Houses on the National Register of Historic Places in Philadelphia
Washington Square West, Philadelphia
Georgism
Historic American Buildings Survey in Philadelphia
Federal architecture in Pennsylvania